The New York University Archives has served, since 1977, as the final repository for the historical records of New York University (NYU), in Greenwich Village, New York, U.S. The NYU Archives contains documents, photographs or drawings collected since 1854, including records or notebooks of some notable people. It functions primarily to document the history of the university and to provide source material for administrators, faculty, students, alumni, and other members of the university community. The NYU Archives also accommodates scholars, authors, and other interested persons who seek to evaluate the impact of the university's activities on the history of American social, cultural and intellectual development.

The archives houses official records, papers, and publications of New York University; personal or professional papers of New York University faculty; Special Collections (records and papers which are neither official university records nor faculty papers, but which relate to the history of New York University; and an Archives Reference Collection (vertical subject files, biographical directories, archival manuals and publications, copies of books and publications by faculty members, duplicate yearbooks, repository guides and finding aids and inventories to materials related to New York University that are housed in other repositories). In all, the NYU Archives contains  of archive and manuscript materials.

Mission
The core mission of the University Archives is:
 To appraise, collect, organize, describe, make available, and preserve records of historical, legal, fiscal, and/or administrative value to New York University
 To provide adequate facilities for the retention and preservation of such records
 To provide information services that will assist the operation of the university
 To serve as a resource and laboratory to stimulate and nourish creative teaching and learning
 To serve research and scholarship by making available and encouraging the use of its collections by members of the university and the community at large
 To promote knowledge and understanding of the origins, aims, programs, and goals of the university, and of the development of these aims, goals, and programs
 To implement records management by formulating policy and procedures that will ensure the collection and preservation of archival materials

History
Although August 1977 marked the NYU Archives' designation as the "official repository for all non-current records of the University," its origins date to NYU's Antebellum period. In June 1854, Isaac Ferris, NYU's third president, received a motion from the University Council to collect the publications of alumni for preservation in the library, and “to obtain for deposit in the archives the plates of all the commencements and exhibitions.”

In 1922, NYU Chancellor Elmer Ellsworth Brown commissioned Professor Theodore F. Jones to write a history of the university in commemoration of its centennial celebration in 1932. Dr. Jones assembled the "New York University Collection," which included printed and manuscript material relating to the history of NYU, and placed the collection in the Treasure Room at the Gould Memorial Library on the University Heights Campus (currently the site of Bronx Community College). Jones gathered council minutes, financial records, chancellor's files, official university publications, books, pamphlets, academic bulletins, student/faculty publications and photographs, among numerous other materials, to form the nucleus of the University Archives as it exists today.

In 1967, NYU President James M. Hester established the Office of University Archivist and commissioned Dr. Thomas C. Pollock "to gather material for and write a modern history of the University." According to minutes of the advisory committee on the history of New York University (ACHNYU) meeting from June 14, 1967, "...Pollock had agreed to become Archivist of the University with the responsibility for writing a new history...The Office of the Archivist would be set up and a small staff would work under Dr. Pollock's supervision in collecting data for the history. Up to that time, NYU had assigned the role of managing the university's records – mainly the minutes of the governing council and the academic senate – to the secretary of the university.

Under the supervision of the advisory committee chaired by Professor Bayard Still, Dr. Pollock and his full-time research assistant, Emilie Adam, collected and preserved materials deemed essential for writing a history of NYU in the 20th century. The pair disseminated questionnaires to long-service University personnel, requesting accounts of their experiences at NYU. Pollock and Adam additionally asked department chairpersons to submit brief histories of their respective departments and divisions.

Upon Dr. Pollock's resignation in March 1969, President Hester assigned responsibility for the archival program to Professor Still, who, along with Ms. Adam, worked effectively in carrying this endeavor forward. Professor Still and Adam conducted oral interviews with instrumental figures in the University's history, microfilmed a complete set of Council/Board of Trustees minutes, and acquired missing volumes of student newspapers and periodicals. The combined efforts of Dr. Jones and Drs. Pollock and Still – over nearly 50 years – effectively preserved NYU's historical record.

In January 1969, Dr. Pollock expressed to university librarian Dr. Charles F. Gosnell, the need for the consolidation of the historical materials assembled under the ongoing documentary program: "The University Archives should be kept in a central place. It would seem logical to have them in or near the Elmer H. Bobst Library when it is completed."

The sale of the University Heights Campus in 1973 expedited the consolidation Pollock had desired – The New York University Collection was moved from the Heights Campus and reassembled in 1974 at 19 University Place. On September 20, 1974, Chancellor Sidney Borowitz formally designated Professor Still as director of the Archives Office.

The University Archives remained at 19 University Place until the summer of 1979 when the collection moved to Bobst Library, sharing the space on the tenth floor with the Tamiment Library and Robert F. Wagner Archives. The University Archives eventually moved into its own quarters in 1981, finding a home in the East wing of the tenth floor of Bobst. In 1986, under the administration of university archivist Tom Frusciano, the archives adopted the new RG/MC system, abandoning the shelf-list arrangement used since the centennial documentary project conducted by Professor Jones. In recent years, the NYU Archives has continued to document the university's history and serve the NYU community under the direction of university archivist Nancy Cricco and assistant university archivist Janet Bunde.

Collections
Among the NYU Archives vast holdings, collections of interest include:

Athletics
The archives holds extensive documentation on intercollegiate athletics at NYU. Materials include clippings, photographs, memorabilia, athletic programs and videotapes.
Highlights of the collection include:
 files of the New York University Basketball Program, 1906–1967
 New York University Football Program Records, 1889–1967
 NYU Olympic Athletes, 1904–1972
 records of the New York University Fencing Program, 1925–1972
 Miguel DeCapriles papers, 1920–1972.

Faculty materials
Faculty material in the archives consists primarily of biographical sketches in vertical files and photographs in portrait files. In certain cases the archives hold more extensive materials.
Highlights include:
 Lyman Bradley Academic Freedom Case
 Edwin Berry Burgum Academic Freedom Case, 1934–1961
 Draper (John and Henry) Family Collection
 Samuel F.B. Morse Collection
 Diary of John Torrey, professor of botany, 1833
 Papers of Richard Pommer, professor of architecture, 1965–1991
 Papers of Derrick Bell, visiting professor, NYU Law School
 Papers of Annette Weiner, professor of anthropology, former dean of Graduate School of Arts and Science

History of NYU
The majority of the material in the archives documents NYU's history. Publications, minutes, annual reports, photographs and memorabilia all illustrate the ways in which the university has changed and grown, as well as the traditions it has maintained. Specific collections also bring the story of the university to life.
Highlights include:
 Records of the Office of Chancellor/President, 1827–1974
 Clippings Collection, 1853–1950
 Founding of the university, 1830–1958
 Minutes of the board of trustees, 1829–1964
 Early instruction at the law school, 1832–1856

Student life
This collection documents student life from the founding of the university up to the present day. Material covers official school functions, including classes, conferences, and dances; extracurricular activities, including plays, student publications and sporting teams; and informal occasions, such as concerts in the park and "down time" in dorm rooms and Loeb Student Center. A large collection of photographs supplements the textual material on student life.
Highlights of the collection include:
 Elbert William Brown student notebook, 1897
 William Frank Burroughs student notebook, 1858
 Class collections, 1843–1966
 Student Affairs Office, 1924–1974
 Inventory of student newspapers
 Student organizations' publications and records, to present

John Brademas Congressional Papers
The John Brademas Congressional Papers document the career of John Brademas, president emeritus of NYU, during 22 years as a US Congressional Representative from Indiana's Third District, from 1959 to 1981. Brademas served on the Committee on Education and Labor throughout his tenure and became a leading figure in the creation of legislation concerning education, arts and humanities, vocational rehabilitation, services for the elderly and handicapped and libraries and museums. The collection includes documents related to the administrative, legislative and political functions of his office.

The collection will serve as the cornerstone for a congressional studies center that Brademas is seeking to found at the university.

Publications
The archives holds numerous publications produced by New York University administration, departments, students and community members.
Highlights include:
 Histories of NYU and its schools, colleges and divisions
 Biographies and autobiographies of distinguished trustees, administrators, faculty and alumni
 Selected faculty publications
 Annual Reports, bulletins, catalogs and promotional literature
 Student publications

History of Greenwich Village
Because of NYU's long-term presence in Greenwich Village (New York), the archives holds extensive material documenting the history of the area, on the west side of Lower Manhattan in New York City. Books, clippings and papers written by students in the Public History program all provide information on the area, while its extensive photograph collection illustrates the changing face of the neighborhood.
In addition to this general information, highlights include:
 Northern Dispensary Collection
 Washington Square Association records, 1908–1979

Notes

References
New York University Archives "H" File: "NYU Archives", NYU Archives.
Dim, Joan Marans and Nancy Murphy Cricco. The Miracle on Washington Square: New York University. Maryland: Lexington Books, 2001.
Frusciano, Thomas J. and Marilyn H. Pettit. New York University and the City: an Illustrated History. Rutgers University Press, 1997.

External links
 

Archives in the United States
New York University